An oral torus is a lesion made of compact bone and occurs along the palate or the mandible inside the mouth.  The palatal torus or torus palatinus occurs along the palate, close to the midline, whereas the mandibular torus or torus mandibularis occur along the lingual side of the mandible.

Occurrences of tori are more frequent in women than in men.  Tori are associated with adulthood and rarely appear before the age of 15.  The palatal version of tori have a higher occurrence in Native American and Inuit populations.

Treatment is not necessary unless they become an obstruction to chewing or prosthetic appliances.

References

Ibsen, Olga A.C. & Joan Anderson Phelan, 2004. Oral Pathology for the Dental Hygienist.  4th edition.  Philadelphia, Saunders.  .

Jaw disorders